Euleptorhamphus velox is a species of halfbeak native to the Atlantic.

References 

Hemiramphidae
Fish described in 1868